Landgravine Magdalena Sibylla of Hesse-Darmstadt (28 April 1652 – 11 August 1712) was regent of the Duchy of Württemberg from 1677 to 1693, and was a prominent German composer of baroque hymns.

Life 
Magdalena Sibylla, Duchess of Württemberg was born in Darmstadt, the daughter of Louis VI, Landgrave of Hesse-Darmstadt and Duchess Maria Elisabeth of Holstein-Gottorp.  As a child she lost her mother and came into the care of her aunt, the Queen Dowager Hedwig Eleonora of Sweden.  In Stockholm, she manifested deep religious beliefs.  On the occasion of a visit to the Württemberg crown prince William Louis she became engaged to him. They married on 6 November 1673 in Darmstadt.

Just six months after the ceremony Duke Eberhard III died and her husband Wilhelm Ludwig inherited the throne of Württemberg.  In 1677 he, too, died of a heart attack.  Thus, the 25-year-old Magdalena Sibylla became Duchess of Württemberg and regent for her minor son Eberhard Ludwig, who would take the throne in 1693, at the age of 16.

Through piety and prudence in all decisions, she enjoyed great popularity.  Her religion is reflected in the numerous hymns she wrote, quite a few of which found a permanent place in Protestant hymnals. From 1690 to 1692, she employed the composer Johann Pachelbel.  After the accession of the heir apparent, she retreated to Kirchheim castle, where she died.

Issue 
 Eleonore Dorothea (1674–1683)
 Eberhardine Luise (1675–1707)
 Eberhard Louis (1676–1733), the next Duke of Württemberg
 Magdalena Wilhelmine (born November 7, 1677 – died October 30, 1742) - married to Charles III William

Works
Christian View of the Troubled Times, Nuremberg 1680 (prose devotions with additional verse)
New Increased ... Devotional Sacrifice, Stuttgart 1683 (184 hymns, and further editions under different titles)
The Heart Crucified With Jesus, 3 vols, Stuttgart and elsewhere in 1691 (prayers and songs)
Spiritual Apothecary for the Sick, Stuttgart 1703 (devotional book)

Sources
 Gerhard Dünnhaupt: "Magdalena Sibylla of Württemberg (1652-1712)", in: Personal Bibliographies of the Pressures of the Baroque, Vol 4, Stuttgart: Hiersemann 1991, p. 2633-37. 
 
 Werner Raupp (Ed.): Gelebter Glaube. Erfahrungen und Lebenszeugnisse aus unserem Land. Ein Lesebuch, Metzingen/Württ. 1993, S. 96–100, 385 (Introd., Source text, Further Reading). 

House of Hesse-Darmstadt
17th-century women rulers
1652 births
1712 deaths
Burials at Stiftskirche, Stuttgart
German female regents
17th-century German women writers
18th-century German women writers
17th-century German poets
German women poets
Writers from Darmstadt
Duchesses of Württemberg
17th-century dukes of Württemberg
Women hymnwriters
Women religious writers
Daughters of monarchs